Diana Marilyn Quick (born 23 November 1946) is an English actress.

Early life and family background
Quick was born on 23 November 1946 in London, England. She grew up in Dartford, Kent, the third of four children. Her father was Leonard Quick, a dentist.  She was educated at Dartford Grammar School for Girls, Kent. She was greatly aided by her English teacher, who encouraged her to pursue acting. She became a member of an amateur dramatic society in Crayford, Kent, while at school as well as appearing in many school productions. On leaving school, she went on in 1964 to pursue further studies at Lady Margaret Hall, Oxford. Quick was the first female president of the Oxford University Dramatic Society.

Quick spent seven years researching a book about her paternal family's life in India, which was published in 2009 by Virago with the title A Tug on the Thread: From the British Raj to the British Stage. In her book, Quick reveals that she is of mixed race (Anglo-Indian) descent. Her great-grandfather served 23 years in the army in India before becoming a policeman, and her great-grandmother had to flee from the Indian Rebellion of 1857 after her father was killed.

Career
Quick is perhaps best known for the role of Lady Julia Flyte in the television production of Brideshead Revisited. She received an Emmy and  British Academy Television Awards nomination for her work. Quick has also appeared in many theatre, film and television productions. She made her stage debut in A Midsummer Night's Dream at the Open Air Theatre, Regent's Park, London, in 1959. She has appeared in many stage productions in the United Kingdom and the United States, including The Rivals (1965), Hedda Gabler (1968), Measure for Measure (1970), The School for Scandal (1972), Hay Fever (1973), The Duchess of Malfi (1975), Saint Joan (1977), The Skin of Our Teeth (1981), and The Good Person of Szechwan (1984). Other stage work has included roles in Shakespeare's Troilus and Cressida and Brecht's The Threepenny Opera.

In 2009, she portrayed Queen Elizabeth II in "How Do You Solve a Problem Like Camilla?", an episode of the television documentary drama The Queen. Quick had played the same character as a younger woman in Alan Bennett's stageplay A Question of Attribution, one half of his  Single Spies double bill. She explained how she prepared for the television role:

I think one has to try to be as accurate as possible. You have to wear the right clothes, and in my case I wore a white wig, because I'm playing her as a mature Queen rather than when she was a younger woman. So you try and get the externals as accurate as possible, but then I think it's like any acting challenge, you just try to play the situation as truthfully as you can. So you play the spirit of the thing rather than the documentary reality of it.

Personal life

Quick was married to Scottish actor Kenneth Cranham from 1974 until they divorced in 1978. From 1980 until 2008 her partner was English actor Bill Nighy with whom she worked in David Hare's A Map of the World at the National Theatre in 1982. They have one daughter, actress Mary Nighy.

Politics
Quick was one of several celebrities who endorsed the successful parliamentary candidacy of the Green Party's Caroline Lucas at the 2015 general election.

Filmography

Film
The Brothers Karamazov (1958) - Minor Role (uncredited)
Nicholas and Alexandra (1971) - Sonya
A Private Enterprise (1974) - Penny
The Duellists (1977) - Laura
The Big Sleep (1978) - Mona Grant
The Odd Job (1978) - Fiona Harris
Ordeal by Innocence (1984) - Gwenda Vaughan
1919 (1985) - Anna
Max, Mon Amour (1986) - Camille
Vroom (1988) - Susan
Wilt (1989) - Sally
Nostradamus (1994) - Diane de Poitiers
Rasputin: Dark Servant of Destiny (1996) - Grand Duchess Ella
The Leading Man (1996) - Susan
Vigo (1998) - Emily
A Monkey's Tale (1999) - Princess Ida (voice)
Saving Grace (2000) - Honey
The Discovery of Heaven (2001) - Sophia Brons
The Affair of the Necklace (2001) - Madame Pomfré
AKA (2002) - Lady Gryffoyn
Revengers Tragedy (2002) - The Duchess
Love/Loss (2010) - Angela
Mother's Milk (2011) - Kettle
Side by Side (2013) - Joan Dunbar
The Death of Stalin (2017) - Polina Molotova

Television
The Complete and Utter History of Britain (1969) - Ladye / Damsel in Distress
A Christmas Carol (1971, TV Short) - Ghost of Christmas Past (voice)
The Protectors (1974, Episode: "The Bridge") - Anna De Santos
Kolchak: The Night Stalker (1975, Episode: "The Trevi Collection") - Ariel (as Diane Quick)
The Three Hostages (1977, TV Movie) - Mary Hannay
Brideshead Revisited (1981) - Julia Flyte / Julia Mottram
 The Woman in White (1982) - Marian Halcombe
Minder: An Officer and a Car Salesman (1988) - Angie
Inspector Morse (1992) - Hilary Stephens
Dandelion Dead (1994) - Marion Glassford-Gale
Little Big Mouth (2001) - Cass
Dalziel and Pascoe (2002) - ACC Stella Applegarth - “For Love Nor Money”, “The Unwanted”
Agatha Christie’s Poirot (2003) - Mrs. Welman - Episode: “Sad Cypress”
Doctor Who: Scream of the Shalka (2003) - Prime - 5 episodes
Midsomer Murders (2004) - Clare Bonavita - Episode: “Dead in the Water”
Kingdom (2008) - Janet Cramer
The Queen (2009) - The Queen
New Tricks (2009) - Julia Eldridge
Lewis (2010) - Gwen Raeburn
Inspector George Gently (2012) - Gitta Bronson - Episode: “Gently in the Cathedral”
The Missing (2014) - Mary Garrett - Episode: “Molly”
Midsomer Murders (2016) - Hermione Lancaster - Episode: “Habeas Corpus”
The Living and the Dead (2016) - Sylvia - TV Series
Father Brown (2022) - Lady Cecily - Episode: “The Final Devotion”

References

External links
 

1946 births
Living people
20th-century English actresses
21st-century English actresses
Actresses from Kent
Actresses from London
Alumni of Lady Margaret Hall, Oxford
Anglo-Indian people
English film actresses
English stage actresses
English television actresses
English voice actresses
National Youth Theatre members
People educated at Dartford Grammar School for Girls
People from Dartford
Royal Shakespeare Company members